Dontae is a given name. Notable people with the given name include:

Dontae Johnson (born 1991), American football player
Dontae' Jones (born 1975), American basketball player
Dontae Morris (born 1985), American serial killer
Dontae Richards-Kwok (born 1989), Canadian sprinter

See also
Donta, given name and surname
Donte, given name
Dontay, given name